Events from the year 1745 in Denmark.

Incumbents
 Monarch – Christian VI
 Prime minister – Johan Ludvig Holstein-Ledreborg

Events

Births
 7 January – Johan Christian Fabricius, zoologist (died 1808)
 19 February – Anna Sofie Bülow, courtier (died 1787)
 12 May – Jens Juel, painter (died 1802)
 19 May – Mette Marie Rose, stage actor (died 1819)

Deaths
 16 March – Elias David Häusser, architect (born 1687 in Germany)
 19 June – Johan Lorentz Castenschiold, merchant and landowner (born 1705) 
 26 October – Nathanael Diesel, composer (born 1692) 
 13 November – Iver Rosenkrantz, statesman and landowner (born 1674)

References

 
1740s in Denmark
Denmark
Years of the 18th century in Denmark